The 1896–97 season was the fourth season in which Dundee competed at a Scottish national level, playing in Division One, finishing in 5th place for the 2nd consecutive season. Dundee would also compete in the Scottish Cup. Dundee would switch their main kit colours from sky blue and white stripes to a white shirt and black shorts.

Scottish Division One 

Statistics provided by Dee Archive

League table

Scottish Cup 

Statistics provided by Dee Archive

Player Statistics 
Statistics provided by Dee Archive

|}

See also 

 List of Dundee F.C. seasons

References 

 

Dundee F.C. seasons
Dundee